Priceline is an Australian health and beauty retailer. The Priceline brand has two store types; a traditional Priceline and Priceline Pharmacy. It is owned by Australian Pharmaceutical Industries, which was acquired by Wesfarmers in 2022.

History
Priceline was established in 1982; the first store opened at Highpoint Shopping Centre, and started as a beauty retailer. In 2004 Australian Pharmaceutical Industries (API) acquired the New Price Retail business which operated the retail brands of Priceline, Priceline Pharmacy, House, and Price Attack. API divested its House and Price Attack chains in 2007 to focus its retailing strategy on the Priceline brand. In 2008 Priceline launched a brand re-positioning with a new visual identity, store format and merchandise. This is when the livery changed to the recognisable magenta pink shade synonymous with the Priceline brand. In November 2021, Priceline was included in the sale of Australian Pharmaceutical Industries to Wesfarmers.

Priceline Brand
Priceline is a health and beauty retailer of cosmetics, skin care, hair care and health care products. Priceline is involved in pharmaceutical retailing through the Priceline Pharmacy brand. There are currently over 470 Priceline stores throughout Australia.

Australian business publication BRW ranked Priceline as Australia's 16th fastest growing franchise by revenue in 2010. Total network sales for the financial year 2019 were up 2.4 per cent to $2.2 billion.

Priceline sponsors the Western Bulldogs AFL Women's team.

Current brand ambassadors include Ita Buttrose, Chrissie Swan, Tanya Hennessy and Lindy Rama-Ellis, Ada Nicodemou

Loyalty scheme
Priceline's loyalty program, Sister Club, has over 7 million members, making it one of the largest health and beauty retail loyalty programs in Australia. Members earn points when making purchases and are rewarded with discount vouchers and prizes. Sister Club members accounted for more than 40% of retail sales in 2009, with the average Club member sale more than 30% higher than for a non-Club customer.

Industrial relations case
In 2007, Andrew Cruickshank, a store layout planner, was dismissed from his job from Priceline for 'operational reasons' under the WorkChoices Legislation. He alleged Priceline fired him on his $101 000 a year contract, replacing him with someone on a $75 000 contract. Priceline claimed otherwise, saying "It was not the same role...the person wouldn't have been capable of doing the same things". The Australian Industrial Relations Commission ruled in favour of Priceline and found that Cruickshank's termination resulted from Priceline's financial difficulties and the subsequent decision to reorganise its structure.

Class Action Lawsuit
A potential class action lawsuit in 2021 was being planned by law firm Levitt Robinson on behalf of Priceline franchisees. The class action centered around control of the pharmacies faced trouble initially when the litigation funder withdrew. Then in 2022, the class action was discontinued after too few franchisees joined the class action.

References

External links
Priceline Website

Priceline stores locations
Pharmacies of Australia
Retail companies established in 1982
Wesfarmers
1982 establishments in Australia